Australian Frog Calls (also referred to as Songs of Disappearance: Australian Frog Calls) is an album of Australian frog calls, released on 2 December 2022 by the Bowerbird Collective and Australian Museum, it compiles frog sounds from both biologist recordings and public submissions. The album debuted at number 3 on the on the ARIA Charts.

Australian Frog Calls was a collaboration between the Bowerbird Collective, Australian Museum FrogID project, Listening Earth and Mervyn Street of Mangkaja Arts. The project brings attention to FrogID Week, an annual event where the public are encouraged to download the free FrogID app and record the frogs they hear calling around them. The project also highlights that one in six Australian native frog species are currently threatened, with four already extinct. 

Calls featured on the album date back to the 1970s from FrogID's database. In addition to raising awareness, proceeds from the album will go towards the Australian Museum's national FrogID project.

FrogID project coordinator Nadiah Roslan said "Frogs are amongst the most threatened groups of animals on the planet and declining more rapidly than any other animal group... This decline is concerning because we need frogs to be around—they play such an important role in healthy ecosystems and this role can't be filled by any other animal group."

The album follows Australian Bird Calls, which was composed of endangered Australian bird calls and peaked at number 2 on the ARIA Charts in February 2022.

Reception
A staff writer at The Music posted a review consisting entirely of frog noises.

The album debuted at number 3 on the ARIA charts behind Paul Kelly's Christmas Train and Taylor Swift's Midnights.

Track listing

Charts

References

External links
 Official website
 
2022 albums